Lee Kyu-wan (hangul 이규완 李圭完; November 15, 1862 - December 15, 1946) was a politician, philosopher, and revolutionist during Korea's Joseon period. His Japanese names were Asada Ryo (아사다 료, 淺田良) and Asada Ryoichi (아사다 료이치, 淺田良一). In 1884, he was one of several military leaders in the brief Gapsin Coup, a Japanese-supported attempt to overthrow the royal palace in Seoul.

Life
Lee was born in Gwangju, Gyeonggi Province. He had ancestry in the royal family of the Joseon Dynasty, descending from Prince Limyoung, the fifth son of Sejong the Great. Lee had a somewhat distant relationship with his family; his father was in the process of moving to Seoul from Guangzhou, and worked as a woodcutter, while his mother died early on in his life, which led his father to remarry. In Lee's youth, he came under the influence of reformist politicians Park Young-hyo and Seo Jae-pil, who arranged for him study in Japan in 1883. In 1884 he returned to Korea and was appointed to a junior military post.

In December 1884, he was one military leader of the short-lived Gapsin coup. When the coup failed, Lee escaped to Yamaguchi, Japan. He spent a long time wandering throughout areas near the southeastern tip of Honshu, such as Yamaguchi, Shimonoseki, and Fukuoka. During most of his time in Japan, he was an employee of a silk factory and rice mill, owned by the Nakamura family. One member of the family, Nakamura Ichi, was a diplomat for the United States in Japan at that time. The owner of the silk factory eventually paired Lee and Nakamura Umeko (中村梅子), Nakamura's daughter, whom Lee married on July 15, 1896.

In 1894, he was pardoned and returned to Korea, but the next year he was identified as being involved in Park Young-hyo's coup d'état. Both escaped. On May 11, 1907, while staying in Japan, Kojong was appointed deputy director of the Northwestern forestry service office (서북영림창;西北營林廠). In July 1907, he was again pardoned and returned to Korea, at which time he was appointed Jungchuwon Buchanui. In 1908, he became the governor of Gangwon Province. In 1910 he was reappointed to the post under the Japanese General Government, In 1918, he became governor of South Hamgyong Province, but resigned seven years later. In his later years he was active in farming and wasteland reclamation, as well as charitable work. He placed importance upon diligence and thrift, expressing disdain for idleness and laziness. In particular, he extremely disliked unemployed, idle peoples.

Family
Lee's first son, Lee Sun-kil (이선길;李鮮吉), was a judoka and educator in Korea. His other son, Lee Young-il (이영일;李英一) was a painter and middle school teacher.

See also
 Gapsin coup
 Seo Jae-pil
 Park Young-hyo
 Yun Chi-ho
 Kim Ok-gyun

References

External links

 [춘천] “지역의 숨은 건축유산을 한 눈에” The Kangwonilbo 2012.12.24 
 [진귀품 감상] 관심 두어야 할 근·현대사료(2)  The Kangwonilbo 2012.03.22 
 일본인 쓴 ‘춘천찬가’… 아픔의 역사 속 빛나는 절경 강원도민일보 2012.02.27 
 70여년 전 ‘경춘 철도 시승기’ 공개 화제 강원도민일보 2012.02.27 
 춘천농공고 개교 100주… 도내 고교 중 처음

Joseon politicians
Korean politicians
1862 births
1946 deaths
Korean collaborators with Imperial Japan
Soh Jaipil
Yun Chi-ho
19th-century Korean people
Officials of the Korean Empire